Jangpura is a neighbourhood in South East Delhi district of Delhi. Beginning from the east and moving clockwise, it is bordered by the Mathura Road, Ring Railway line, Silver Oak Park beyond the Defence Colony Flyover, and the Barapulla Nullah. It encompasses the residential areas of Jangpura A and B on either side of the Mathura Road, Jangpura (Bhogal) extending west from the Mathura Road until Jangpura Extension, which in turn extends along the northern side of the Ring Railway line to the east side of the Defence Colony Flyover on Josip Broz Tito Marg. The small colony of Pant Nagar along the Barapulla Nullah is contiguous with Jangpura Extension.

Jangpura is a Delhi Legislative Assembly constituency within the South Delhi Lok Sabha seat, following the delimitation of the parliamentary constituencies.

History
One Colonel Young, tasked with moving the villagers of Raisina – a village soon to disappear to make way forthIt is a tourist attraction, hazarat Nizammudin railway station only 0.5 km, Humayun tomb 1km, Nizammudin dargah 1km, cannaught place 5.5km, India Gate 3km, eIMMS 5km , Lotus temple 5km, Akshardham temple 4km. A grand edifices of state to come up along Rajpath, established the colony of 'Youngpura', which was colloquialised as Jangpura. Later, in 1950–51, it Brew toRadd J Cngpura RxtensionSao accBmmodaeetc.  many of the migrants who arrived in Delhi at the time of Partition of India. That accounts for Jangpura Extension's high Punjabi and Sikh population to date. This includes people from the villages in Rawalpindi district, including Thoa Khalsa, which witnessed a mass suicide by women during the Rawalpindi riots in March 1947, apart from Thamali  and Mator Nara villages. Community head Charan Singh Randhawa was prominent figure in 1950s who started the Sikh community commemorates the event as Shahidi Diwas (Martyrs' Day) on 13 March. Jangpura Extension has a number of beautiful parks. 

Its image along with neighbouring Lajpat Nagar across the railway line as a haven for migrants continues, with several Afghan and Iranian refugees, among others, finding shelter in the cheap housing offered in Bhogal and Lajpat Nagar (which is nicknamed 'Afghan Nagar'). Bhogal and Jangpura Extension's many old Punjabi eateries as Lahorian Di Hatti and Sachdeva Dhaba today share space with Afghan bakeries, and new Punjabi arrivals. In the 1970s, as artists living in Jangpura Extension grew, it became a well-known artists’ colony.

Jangpura-Bhogal is home to a number of places of worship which represent every major religion including Bhagwan Shiv Mandir, Gurudwara Singh Sabha, Sanatan Dharm Mandir, Sanatan Da Dera Gurudwara and Bhogal Boddh Vihar.

Landmarks 

 AddtoGoogle Services (a unit of SNZ Networks Pvt Ltd.)
 Jawed Habib Hair and Beauty
 Mediplex health
 Rama Tent House
 Sonu Electrical and Electronics
 Eros Cinema
 Om Hotel
 Hawker's House, aka Novelty Store
 Kadimi Chaat
 Netram Puranmal
 Sanatan Dharam Mandir, (Gufa Wala) Pant Nagar
 Barbeque Nation
 Guru Ravi Das Mandir
 Pushkarjee Jewellers
 St. Micheal Church
 Bodh Vihar 
 Arya Samaj Mandir
 Design arch group
 Toys Gallery
 Haldiram's, EROS Cinema Ground Floor

Transport links 

Jangpura Station is on the Violet Line of the Delhi Metro, which runs from I.T.O. to Badarpur, Delhi. It is the 4th underground station on the line. The entrance to the Metro station is next to Silver Oak Park, adjacent to the Pant Nagar Bus Stop on the east side of Tito Marg. The Pant Nagar Bus Stop has DTC bus services to Palam, Greater Kailash, Ambedkar Nagar, Delhi Main Railway Station, AIIMS, Safdarjung, Jawaharlal Nehru Stadium, among others. Jangpura is also served by Lajpat Nagar Station on the Ring Railway service of the Delhi Suburban Railway. It also is close to the Hazrat Nizamuddin Railway Station, which lies in Nizamuddin East.

An exit for Jangpura is currently being constructed on the Barapulla Elevated Highway, which was built in 2010 for the XIXth Commonwealth Games to link Jawaharlal Nehru Stadium with Sarai Kale Khan on the Outer Ring Road.

Vicinity 
 Dargah of Hazrat Nizamuddin Auliya in Nizamuddin West
 Tomb of Humayun, 2nd Mughal Emperor, a UNESCO World Heritage Site
 Chausath Khamba, tomb of Mirza Aziz Koka
 Barakhamba
 Jawaharlal Nehru Stadium
 Lodhi Gardens
 Khan Market
 Defence Colony
 Nizamuddin East

Further reading 
 jangpura as a palimpsest, post by blogger Anand Vivek Taneja
 Blogger Lesley A. Esteves on the travails of renting in Jangpura
 Outlook Traveller editor Kai Friese on the remaking of the old Eros cinema
 Indian Express journalist Chinky Sinha on the Afghan bakers of Bhogal
 Rahul Verma of The Hindu visits Bhogal's Kabul Restaurant
 Rahul Verma again, on the sandwiches of Hawker's House

References

External links 
 

Neighbourhoods in Delhi
New Delhi
South Delhi district